Barbara Perez (born January 4, 1938) is a Filipina actress in movies and television in the Philippines. She was tagged as the "Audrey Hepburn of the Philippines" due to her doe eyes, pixie face, swan-like neck and 19-inch waistline. In the west she appeared in No Man Is an Island, a 1962 Hollywood movie starring Jeffrey Hunter.

Career
Perez appeared in more than 75 movies and television shows since 1956. Perez made films included Pagdating ng Takip-Silim (1956), Chabacano (1956), Pampanguena (1956), Gigolo (1956), Ate Barbara (1957), Kalabog En Bosyo (1959) and Tatlong Ilaw sa Dambana (1958).

After she made No Man Is an Island (1962), she was offered a five-year contract by Universal Studios. But she turned it down and decided to marry her boyfriend, Robert Arevalo. She appeared with her real-life husband in Daigdig ng Mga Api (1965) which garnered Best Actor and Best Actress awards for the couple.

She made other films, such as P.S. I Love You (1981) starring Sharon Cuneta and Gabby Concepcion, Blusang Itim (1986) starring Snooky Serna and Richard Gomez, Taray at Teroy (1988) starring Maricel Soriano and Randy Santiago, Ang Babaeng Nawawala sa Sarili (1989) with Dina Bonnevie, and Iisa Pa Lamang (1992) with Dawn Zulueta.

She appeared on television via ABS-CBN's series Budoy (2011) and Kahit Puso'y Masugatan (2012).

In 2018 after almost 5 years on hiatus she returned to showbiz via GMA Network's series Sherlock Jr.

Personal life
Born Barbara Muñoz Perez III, after her grandmother and mother, she is the eldest among the nine children of Antonio Perez from Urdaneta, Pangasinan and Barbara Munoz of Manila. Her grandfather was a Spanish engineer, who was among the builders of the national landmark, the Manila Hotel.

Perez was a journalism junior at University of Santo Tomas before entering showbiz. She married veteran dramatic actor Robert Arevalo, with whom she has three children, Anna, a director of commercials; Georgina, a full-time hands-on mom; and Christian, a student at Xavier School.

Awards and nominations
1969 Nominated FAMAS Award Best Actress Barbaro Cristobal (1968)
1967 Nominated FAMAS Award Best Actress Ito ang Pilipino (1966)
1966 Won FAMAS Award Best Actress Ang Daigdig ng Mga Api (1965)
1961 Nominated FAMAS Award Best Supporting Actress Gumuhong Bantayog (1960)

Filmography
TelevisionAng Iibigin Ay Ikaw (2002)Ang Iibigin Ay Ikaw Pa Rin (2003)Budoy (2011-2012)Kahit Puso'y Masugatan (2012-2013)Tubig at Langis (2016)Sherlock Jr. (2018)

Selected moviesPampanguena (1956)Pagdating ng Takip Silim (1956)Isang Milyong Kasalanan (1957)Tatlong Ilaw sa Dambana (1958)Ipinagbili Kami ng Aming Tatay (1959)7 Amores (1960)Dayukdok (1961)No Man Is an Island (1962)Ang Daigdig ng Mga Api (1965)Dear Kuya Cesar (1968)Asedillo (1971)Supergirl (1973)Ang Boyfriend Kong Baduy (1976)P.S. I Love You (1981)Exploitation (1983)The Sisters (1987)Ibulong Mo sa Diyos (1988)Taray at Teroy (1988)Nakausap Ko ang Birhen (1988) - mother superiorBihagin ang Dalagang Ito (1989)Bakit Labis Kitang Mahal (1992)Ang Boyfriend Kong Gamol (1994)Ang Ika-Labing Isang Utos: Mahalin Mo, Asawa Mo (1994)Malikmata (2003)The Bicycle'' (2007)

References

External links

1938 births
Living people
20th-century Filipino actresses
21st-century Filipino actresses
Actresses from Manila
People from Urdaneta, Pangasinan
University of Santo Tomas alumni